The Copa Iberoamericana or Copa Iberia was a one-off international football competition. It was created to face the champions of the Copa de Oro Nicolás Leoz and the Copa del Rey, as a result of an agreement signed between CONMEBOL and the Royal Spanish Football Federation.

It was disputed only once between Boca Juniors and Real Madrid in 1994, with the Spanish club prevailing 4–3 on aggregate. In 2015, CONMEBOL included Copa Iberoamericana in the list of its official competitions.

Qualified teams

Venues

Match details

First leg

Second leg

Real Madrid won 4–3 on aggregate

References

1993–94 in Spanish football
1993–94 in Argentine football
1993–94 in European football
1994 in South American football
i
i
Football in Buenos Aires